Reiber is a German surname.  Notable people with the surname include:

 Brent Reiber (born 1966), Swiss ice hockey referee
 Carolin Reiber (born 1940), German television presenter
 Frank Reiber (1909–2002), nicknamed "Tubby", American baseball player
 John Ney Rieber American comic book writer
 Lucas Reiber (born 1993), German actor
 Ludwig Reiber (1904–1979), German art director
Nathan Reiber (1927-2014), Polish born Canadian American real estate developer, tax evader and developer of condo in Surfside, Florida that collapsed in 2021
 Paul Reiber, (born 1947) American Chief Justice on the Vermont Supreme Court
 Willy Reiber, (1895–1980), German film director, producer and set designer

See also
 GC Rieber a Norwegian corporation

German-language surnames